Chris Morgan  (born December 5, 1970 in Los Angeles, California) is an American screenwriter and producer. His writing credits include multiple screenplays in the Fast & Furious franchise, Wanted, and the Fox crime drama Gang Related.  Morgan's production company, Chris Morgan Productions, signed a first-look deal with Universal in 2011. In 2013, Morgan launched a TV production company with a first-look deal at Fox. He was spoofed in a video in The Onion in which he was played by a five-year-old.

Filmography

Film

Television

References

External links

American male screenwriters
Living people
American film producers
1966 births
People from Chicago